West La Crosse is an unincorporated community located in the town of Campbell, La Crosse County, Wisconsin, United States. It is part of the French Island census-designated place.

Notes

Unincorporated communities in La Crosse County, Wisconsin
Unincorporated communities in Wisconsin